Sunbury County (2016 population 27,644) is located in central New Brunswick, Canada. A large military base (CFB Gagetown) is located in the western part of the county south of the town of Oromocto.  The county also hosts forestry and mixed farming. Burton is the county shiretown.

Census subdivisions

Communities
There are three municipalities within Sunbury County (listed by 2016 population):

Much of the Village of Minto lies within Sunbury County, but since most of it is in Queens County, Statistics Canada considers it as part of Queens. Similarly, a small portion of the city of Fredericton lies within Sunbury County, but is counted as part of York.

First Nations
There is one First Nations reservation in Sunbury County (listed by 2016 population):

Parishes
The county is subdivided into seven parishes (listed by 2016 population):

Demographics

Population trend

Mother tongue (2016)

Access Routes
Highways and numbered routes that run through the county, including external routes that start or finish at the county limits:

Highways

Principal Routes

Secondary Routes:

External Routes:
None

Protected areas and attractions

Notable people

See also
List of communities in New Brunswick
Sunbury County, Nova Scotia

References

External links
Sunbury County Guide

 
Counties of New Brunswick